The Swatow dialect, or in Mandarin the Shantou dialect, is a Chinese dialect mostly spoken in Shantou in Guangdong, China. It is a dialect of Chaoshan Min language. It is also mutually intelligible to Teochew to a large extent.

Phonology
Shantou dialect has 18 initials, 61 rimes and 8 tones.

Initials

Rimes

Tones

Tone sandhi
Shantou dialect has extremely extensive tone sandhi rules: in an utterance, only the last syllable pronounced is not affected by the rules. The two-syllable tonal sandhi rules are shown in the table below:

References

Further reading

External links

Guangdong
Southern Min
Southern Min-language dialects
Shantou
Teochew dialect